Dorte Ekner (born 2 May 1951) is a Danish former professional tennis player.

A three-time national singles champion, Ekner represented Denmark in 15 Federation Cup ties between 1973 and 1982, for wins in four singles and five doubles rubbers.

Ekner became the first Danish woman to reach the quarter-finals of a grand slam tournament during her run at the 1978 Australian Open. Competing as a main draw qualifier, Ekner defeated the sixth-seeded Cynthia Doerner and West German Heidi Eisterlehner, before falling in the quarter-finals to eventual champion Chris O'Neil.

References

External links
 
 
 

1951 births
Living people
Danish female tennis players